Fly Away is a 1978 album by the French disco group, Voyage.  Their second release repeated the success of their debut released earlier in the year.  All the cuts on Fly Away hit number one on the U.S. disco chart early in 1979 for one week. Unlike the cuts on their debut album, one track from Fly Away made the Billboard Hot 100 chart, when "Souvenirs" made it to number 41. The track also became Voyage's second and last chart entry in the U.S.,  reaching no. 73 on the soul singles chart. In the U.K., "Souvenirs" and "Let's Fly Away" both charted, reaching no. 56 and no. 38 respectively, with the latter their last U.K. chart entry.

"Souvenirs" became a disco staple and a disco smash hit in the Philippines during the Rise of Disco Music in the early 1980s.

Track listing
Side A
 "Souvenirs" — 6:18
 "Kechak Fantasy" — 3:02
 "Eastern Trip" — 2:09
 "Tahiti, Tahiti" — 5:07

Side B
 "Let's Fly Away" – 5:07
 "Golden Eldorado" – 4:56
 "Gone with the Music" – 6:42

Personnel

 Strings & Horns Arranged By – Marc Chantereau, Pierre-Alain Dahan, Slim Pezin
 Bass – Sauveur Mallia
 Drums & Percussion – Pierre-Alain Dahan
 Engineer – Paul Scemama, Stephen W. Tayler
 Guitar & Percussion – Slim Pezin
 Trumpet on "Golden Eldorado" – Pierre Dutour
 Keyboards, Percussion, Vocals – Marc Chantereau
 Lead Vocals – Sylvia Mason-James
 Producer – Roger Tokarz
 Programmed By – Joël Fajerman
 Synthesizer – Georges Rodi
 Steel Guitar on "Tahiti, Tahiti" – Pete Willsher
 Vocals – Bobby McGee, Georges Costa, Pierre-Alain Dahan, Slim Pezin, Kay Garner, Matai, Michael Costa, 
Moeani, Nick Curtis, Stephanie de Sykes, Tahia, Titi, Marc Chantereau

References

External links
 https://www.discogs.com/Voyage-Fly-Away/master/6627
 https://musicbrainz.org/release-group/f1f6a45c-8221-46a6-b7e1-55c652d7986b
 https://dereksmusicblog.com/2012/07/01/disco-recharge-voyage-lets-fly-away/

1978 albums
Voyage (band) albums
Albums recorded at Trident Studios